Degrees of Separation is a 2019 puzzle video game developed by the Norwegian studio Moondrop and published by Modus Games.

Release 
In September 2018, Modus Games announced that they would publish the game in February 2019. It was duly released on February 14, 2019 for Nintendo Switch, PlayStation 4, Xbox One, and for Windows via Steam.

Story and Gameplay 
The game revolves around two characters named Ember, a girl from a kingdom that thrives off of heat and Rime, a boy from a kingdom that thrives off of ice, who must use their powers of heat and ice in order to discover what has led to the downfall of their respective kingdoms. The game is a co-operative platformer, and has both local and online multiplayer.

Reception 
The game received mixed to positive reviews from critics. It was praised for its art design, soundtrack and puzzles, although it was criticized for some monotonous mechanics and some bugs.

References

2019 video games
Fantasy video games
Nintendo Switch games
PlayStation 4 games
Video games developed in Norway
Video games featuring female protagonists
Puzzle video games
Windows games
Xbox One games
Multiplayer and single-player video games